The Man Called Back is a 1932 American Pre-Code film directed by Robert Florey.

This film was independently produced for the bargain-basement price of $68,000, partly because Florey was allowed to re-use the tropical set constructed for the RKO Radio Pictures film Bird of Paradise (1932).

Plot
A disgraced doctor (Nagel) exiles himself to the South Seas, and is rehabilitated by meeting a society woman (Kenyon) and her irresponsible husband  (Halliday). He returns to London.

Cast
 Conrad Nagel as Dr. David Yorke
 Doris Kenyon as Diana St. Claire
 John Halliday as Gordon St. Claire
 Juliette Compton as Vivien Lawrence
 Reginald Owen as Dr. Atkins
 Mona Maris as Lilaya
 Alan Mowbray as King's Counsel
 Gilbert Emery as Defense Counsel
 Mae Busch as Rosie
 Lionel Belmore as Mr. Cartright
 Winter Hall as Judge
 May Beatty as Mrs. Lucy Sanderson
 George C. Pearce as Mr. Sanderson

References

External links 
 
 Turner Classic Movies page

1932 films
1932 drama films
American drama films
American black-and-white films
1930s English-language films
Films based on British novels
Films directed by Robert Florey
Tiffany Pictures films
Films set in London
1930s American films
Films with screenplays by Robert Florey
Films set in the Pacific Ocean